The 26th Golden Eagle Awards were held in Changsha, Hunan, China between September 7 and September 9, 2012.

Winners

References

External links
 List of Winners of the 27th Golden Eagle Awards 

2012
2012 in Chinese television
2012 television awards
Events in Changsha
Mass media in Changsha